Rosebery Primary School was a primary school in Loughborough, Leicestershire, England.  It was opened in 1897 and closed by Leicestershire Local Authority in 2006, despite a protracted battle between the local community and the local government.

In March 2007, the school was Grade II listed as having notable historical importance. The listing protects it from demolition and insensitive development. The building and grounds were sold by auction on 20 June 2007 for £875,000,  and planning proposals were submitted in October 2007

References

Defunct schools in Leicestershire
Educational institutions established in 1897
Grade II listed buildings in Leicestershire
Grade II listed educational buildings
1897 establishments in England
Educational institutions disestablished in 2006
2006 disestablishments in England